Osteocephalus heyeri is a species of frogs in the family Hylidae found in Colombia and possibly Brazil and Peru. Its natural habitat is subtropical or tropical moist lowland forests. It is threatened by habitat loss.

References

Osteocephalus
Amphibians of Colombia
Frogs of South America
Amphibians described in 2002
Taxonomy articles created by Polbot